Lolo Letalu Matalasi (born August 12, 1947) is an American Samoan politician, educator, and businessman. He served as the seventh governor of American Samoa, from 2013 to 2021.

Early life and education
Moliga was born in Taʻū, Manu'a, American Samoa. His father was High Chief Moliga Sa'ena Aunuua Moliga, who was from Ta'u. His mother, Soali’i Galea’i, was a native of both Fitiuta and Olosega. He attended Papatea Junior Elementary and attended Samoana High School before graduating from Manu'a High School. Moliga holds a bachelor's degree in education from Chadron State College in Nebraska. He received a master's degree in public administration from San Diego State University on July 30, 2012.

Career
Moliga began his career as a teacher. He then became an elementary school principal before becoming the principal of Manu'a High School in the Manu'a Islands. He would later become an elementary and secondary education administrator within the American Samoan Department of Education. He also served as director of the ASG Budget Office, as well as American Samoa's chief procurement officer for two terms. Outside of public office, Moliga owns a construction firm.

Politics 
Moliga was elected to the American Samoa House of Representatives for four terms. He later became a Senator within the American Samoa Senate, where he served as the body's senate president from 2005 until 2008. Moliga, while still a member of the Senate, considered a candidacy in the 2008 gubernatorial election, but withdrew from the race before announcing a potential running mate citing existing commitments.
 
Moliga was appointed as president of the Development Bank of American Samoa by Governor Togiola Tulafono and confirmed by the Senate.

2012 gubernatorial election

In October 2011, Moliga became the second candidate to declare his intention to run in the 2012 gubernatorial election. He chose Senator Lemanu Peleti Mauga as his running mate for Lieutenant Governor of American Samoa. Mauga, a retired member of the U.S. Army, served as the chairman of both the Budget and Appropriations Committee and the Senate Homeland Security Committee in the American Samoan Senate.

Moliga resigned as the president of the Development Bank of American Samoa (DBAS) to focus on his gubernatorial campaign.

Moliga faced five other candidates in the 2012 gubernatorial election on November 6, 2012 and received the most votes, but not more than the 50% required to win. The runoff was held November 20, 2012, resulting in Moliga defeating Lieutenant Governor Faoa Aitofele Sunia.

2016 gubernatorial election

Moliga won re-election on November 8, 2016 with 60.2% of the vote, defeating Faoa Aitofele Sunia and Tuika Tuika.

COVID-19 pandemic 
On March 16, 2020, Moliga went into voluntary self-isolation in response to the COVID-19 pandemic. Moliga had previously traveled to Seattle and Hawaii, which had experienced cases of COVID-19.

Democratic National Convention
The United States Department of Defense is investigating two masked, uniformed soldiers who joined Moliga when he appeared online during the 2020 Democratic National Convention because uniformed soldiers are not permitted to participate in partisan events.

See also 
 List of current United States governors

References

External links 

 

|-

1947 births
21st-century American politicians
American Samoa Democrats
American Samoa Senators
American Samoan businesspeople
American Samoan politicians
American people of Samoan descent
Chadron State College alumni
Democratic Party governors of American Samoa
Governors of American Samoa
Living people
Members of the American Samoa House of Representatives
San Diego State University alumni